Moat Preah is a village in Pursat Province of western Cambodia. The village lies to the south of Tumpor and north-west of Veal Veng.

References

Villages in Cambodia
Populated places in Pursat province